William D. "Bill" Lorge (born August 31, 1960) is an American real estate broker, farmer, and Republican politician.  He served ten years in the Wisconsin State Assembly, and was an unsuccessful candidate for Governor of Wisconsin in 2002.

Early life 
Born in Bear Creek, Wisconsin, Lorge graduated from Clintonville High School and then received his bachelor's degree from the University of Wisconsin–Madison. He also attended the Austro-American College in Vienna, Austria.

Career
Lorge has been a real estate broker and a farmer. He served as a Congressional aide and a Wisconsin state senate legislative assistant for his father. In 1984 he ran for the 14th District State Senate seat vacated by his father, losing in the primary to Joseph Leean. He served in the Wisconsin State Assembly as a Republican from 1989 until 1999.  A 1996 survey of legislators conducted by Madison Magazine rated Lorge poorly in several categories.  In 1998 Lorge lost to Jean Hundertmark in the primary. That same year, Lorge submitted the highest expense report of any member of the Wisconsin State Assembly.

In 2002, Lorge entered the Republican gubernatorial primary, challenging incumbent Republican Governor Scott McCallum.  He garnered only 8 percent of the vote, as McCallum was renominated.

Personal life
His father, Gerald Lorge, served 30 years in the Wisconsin State Senate. Lorge married Molly McGinty on April 11, 1996, in Bear Creek.  They had four children together before divorcing in 2014.

Lorge has worked as an Elvis Presley impersonator. He owns Badgerland MLS, a real estate company.

References 

1960 births
Living people
People from Outagamie County, Wisconsin
Businesspeople from Wisconsin
Farmers from Wisconsin
Elvis impersonators
University of Wisconsin–Madison alumni
Republican Party members of the Wisconsin State Assembly